Väinö Villiam Siikaniemi (27 March 1887 – 24 August 1932) was a Finnish athlete who competed at the 1912 Summer Olympics. He finished fifth in the conventional javelin throw and won the silver medal in the two-handed javelin throw, a one-time Olympic event in which the total was counted as a sum of best throws with the right hand and with the left hand.

Siikaniemi retired from sports after the 1912 Games and became a math teacher, poet and translator. In 1923 he published his first poem and 1929 a collection of poetry. In 1916 he married singer Oili Silventoinen (1888–1932) and later also wrote lyrics for songs. He died of pneumonia, aged 45. It was said that he caught a cold during a marathon swim, which he took in an attempt to fight depression caused by a sudden death of his wife two weeks earlier.

References

1887 births
1932 deaths
People from Hollola
Finnish male javelin throwers
Olympic silver medalists for Finland
Athletes (track and field) at the 1912 Summer Olympics
Olympic athletes of Finland
Deaths from pneumonia in Finland
Medalists at the 1912 Summer Olympics
Olympic silver medalists in athletics (track and field)
Sportspeople from Päijät-Häme